Jur Modo may refer to:
the Jur Modo people
the Jur Modo language